Fix Me is an album by Marianas Trench.

Fix Me may also refer to:

Fix Me (10 Years song), 2010 song
Nervous Breakdown (EP), Black Flag song
Fix Me, song by Velvet (singer)